The 2015 King's Cup is an international football competition, the 43rd edition of the tournament. It was a group tournament, with all matches held at the 80th Birthday Stadium in Nakhon Ratchasima, Thailand between 1 February and 7 February.

This edition features the hosts Thailand and three invited teams (Honduras, South Korea U-23 and Uzbekistan).

Squads
See 2015 King's Cup Squads

Teams
 1
 
 
 1

1replaced North Korea and Croatia.

Venue
All matches held at the 80th Birthday Stadium in Nakhon Ratchasima, Thailand

Standings and results
All times are Thailand Standard Time (UTC+07:00).

Final standings

Goalscorers
3 goals
  Alberth Elis
  Pokklaw Anan

2 goals
  Jhow Benavidez

1 goals
  Lee Chang-min
  Lee Woo-hyeok
  Song Ju-hun
  Mongkol Tossakrai
  Abbosbek Makhstaliev
  Dirojon Turapov
  Igor Sergeev
  Jamshid Iskanderov
  Maksimilian Fomin
  Sardor Sabirkhodjaev

2 own goals
  Jeffri Flores (against Thailand), (against Uzbekistan U23)

See also
 King's Cup
 Football in Thailand

References

2015 in Thai football cups
2015